The Trenton Group is a limestone geologic group in New York.

It preserves fossils dating back to the Ordovician period.

See also

 List of fossiliferous stratigraphic units in New York

References
 

Geologic groups of New York (state)
Limestone formations of the United States
Ordovician geology of New York (state)